Gabriele Balducci (born 3 November 1975 in Pontedera, Province of Pisa) is an Italian racing cyclist who rode for Acqua & Sapone.

Professional career
His major victory is the 1st stage in the 1998 Tirreno–Adriatico in Sorrento.

Palmares 

 Giro della Provincia di Reggio Calabria – 1 stage (2008)
 Giro d'Italia – 1 stage (2007) after Alessandro Petacchi's disqualification
 Tour Méditerranéen – 1 stage (2001–2007)
 Milan–San Remo
 7th (2001–2007)
 10th (1999)
 Settimana Ciclista Lombarda – 1 stage (2006)
 Giro della Liguria – 1 stage (2003)
 HEW Cyclassics – 6th (2000)
 Giro del Lago Maggiore (1999)
 Tour of Slovenia – 1 stage (1999)
 Tirreno–Adriatico – 1 stage (1998)
 Alassio Cup (1997)
 Italian Road U17 Championship – 2nd (1991)

External links

1975 births
Living people
People from Pontedera
Italian male cyclists
Sportspeople from the Province of Pisa
Cyclists from Tuscany
21st-century Italian people
20th-century Italian people